Lega per l'Autonomia – Alleanza Lombarda (League for Autonomy – Lombard Alliance, LAL), also known as Lega per l'Autonomia Lombarda (League for the Lombard Autonomy), was a left-wing regionalist political party in Italy, based in Lombardy.

History
The party was formed in the run-up of the 1996 general election by the merger of Alleanza Lombarda Autonomia and Lega Alpina Lumbarda. The former was a 1989 split from Lega Lombarda–Lega Nord led by Angela Bossi and Pierangelo Brivio (wife and husband, sister and brother-in-law to Umberto Bossi respectively), while the latter was the political vehicle of Elidio De Paoli, who had been elected in the Senate both in 1992 and 1994.

In the 1996 election the LAL obtained 1.9% of the vote in Lombardy and none of its candidates was elected.

After a row between De Paoli and the couple Bossi-Brivio, the party was disbanded until 2001, when De Paoli re-organized it from scratch.

In the 2001 general election the party won 5.4% for the Senate in Lombardy and 0.9% nationally, as some disgruntled voters of Lega Nord and many unintended voters gave their vote to the LAL. De Paoli was elected senator with proportional representation, after he had won 11.5% in the constituency of Albino. There he stole many votes from Roberto Calderoli, deputy for Albino since 1994 and most voted Lega Nord in 1996 (51.9%), who was elected with a mere 44.2%.

In the 2006 general election the party was affiliated to The Union, the centre-left coalition led by Romano Prodi, and its 0.1% (1.6% in Lombardy) was decisive for the coalition's victory over the centre-right House of Freedoms coalition. Subsequently, De Paoli was appointed undersecretary in Prodi II Cabinet.

In the 2008 general election the LAL won a mere 0.8% for the Senate in Lombardy.

In 2009 the Ministry of the Interior assigned the party's symbol to Matteo Brivio, son of Angela Bossi and Pierangelo Brivio. Consequently, De Paoli returned to use Lega Alpina Lumbarda's symbol, with disappointing results. Since 2008 the LAL did not participate in any major electoral competition and Brivio joined Lega Nord.

Popular support
The electoral results of the party in Lombardy are shown in the table below. For general elections the results always refer to the Senate.

References

1996 establishments in Italy
Political parties established in 1996
Political parties with year of disestablishment missing
Political parties in Lombardy